WDT may refer to:

Walt Disney Treasures, a Disney cartoon DVD series
Wellington Drive Technologies, a company listed on the New Zealand Stock Exchange 
Watchdog timer, a computer hardware timing device
West Drayton railway station, London (by National Rail station code)
World Darts Trophy, a darts tournament played from 2002 to 2007
WDT (New York City), a radio station licensed to the Shop Owners Radio Service from 1921-1923.
West Digital Television, an Australian digital television network owned by Seven West Media and WIN Corporation